Yeni Göyçə, 
 Göyçəkənd, 
 Aşağı Göycəli, 
 Göycəli, is a village and municipality in the Agstafa Rayon of Azerbaijan.